Marzieh Boroumand is an Iranian actress, puppeteer, screenwriter and director of TV series and films. She is best known for Alo!Alo! Man joojoo-am (1994), Barbershop Ziba (1989) and City of Mice (1985). She began her career in cinema by playing in The Cycle directed by Dariush Mehrjui.

Films 
The City of Mice 2 - director, (family film)
The School of Mice - director, (family film)
Eve's Red Apple - Actor

Television
Hotel All of My Children - director, Children's TV series. She was born in the city of Tehran, Iran. She has three sisters and two brothers. She believes the main reason that she never got married was that her job always was her priority.

References

External links

1951 births
Living people
People from Tehran
Iranian puppeteers
Iranian film directors
Iranian film actresses
University of Tehran alumni
Iranian television directors
Iranian women film directors